Joel Whitlock Wells (November 26, 1935 – September 4, 2022) was an American gridiron football player.  He played as a halfback in the National Football League (NFL) for the New York Giants during the 1961 NFL season.  Wells began his career in the Canadian Football League (CFL) in 1957 with the Montreal Alouettes, where he was an All-Star in 1958.

Wells died on September 4, 2022, aged 87.

References

1935 births
2022 deaths
American football halfbacks
American players of Canadian football
Clemson Tigers football players
Montreal Alouettes players
New York Giants players
Players of American football from Columbia, South Carolina
Players of Canadian football from Columbia, South Carolina